Koprišnica is a small village south of Dren along the Došnica river in North Macedonia. It has the only waterfalls in the municipality of Demir Kapija. There are no residents in the village, but former residents and families return to open the church on the Patron Saint's Day, coined Panagjur, on May 8. It is the highest elevated village in the municipality.

Demographics
According to the 2002 census, the village had a total of 0 inhabitants.

References

Notes 
Demir Kapija: From Prehistory to Today , p 97-8

Villages in Demir Kapija Municipality